The XI Memorial of Hubert Jerzy Wagner was held at Orlen Arena in Płock, Poland from 6 to 8 September 2013. Like the previous edition, 4 teams participated in the tournament.

Qualification
All teams except the host must receive an invitation from the organizers.

Venue

Results
All times are Central European Summer Time (UTC+02:00).

Final standing

Awards
Best Scorer:  Nikolay Pavlov
Best Receiver:  Michał Kubiak
Best Blocker:  Marcin Możdżonek
Best Server:  Dmitriy Muserskiy
Best Setter:  Sergey Grankin
Best Libero:  Paweł Zatorski
MVP:  Nikolay Pavlov

References

External links
 Official website

Memorial of Hubert Jerzy Wagner
Memorial of Hubert Jerzy Wagner
Memorial of Hubert Jerzy Wagner